Job 40 is the 40th chapter of the Book of Job in the Hebrew Bible or the Old Testament of the Christian Bible. The book is anonymous; most scholars believe it was written around 6th century BCE. This chapter records the speech of God to Job, which belongs to the "Verdicts" section of the book, comprising Job 32:1–42:6.

Context
Job 40 appears towards the end of the Book of Job. Traditionally placed in the Ketuvim section of the Hebrew Bible between Psalms and Proverbs, in modern Jewish Bibles the book is placed after the other two other poetic books. Job is also one of the poetic books in the Christian Old Testament, usually following the Book of Esther. The book is structured with a prologue and narrative introduction in the first two chapters and then the majority of the book is a debate between Job and number of other people in poetry, which runs until chapter 37.

The chapter is part of the response of God to Job which runs from chapters 38 to 41. The chapter is traditionally divided into three sections. The first two verses are joined with the preceding two chapters from verse 38:1 in God's first speech, Verses 3 to 5 of the chapter are considered a short intermission in God's monologue and cover Job's response to this first speech. The remainder of the chapter from verse 6 to the end of chapter 41 are considered to be God's second speech.

Text
The original text is written in Hebrew language. This chapter is divided into 24 verses in English Bibles, but counted to 32 verses in Hebrew Bible using a different verse numbering (see below).

Verse numbering
There are some differences in verse numbering of this chapter in English Bibles and Hebrew texts:

This article generally follows the common numbering in Christian English Bible versions, with notes to the numbering in Hebrew Bible versions.

Textual witnesses
Some early manuscripts containing the text of this chapter in Hebrew are of the Masoretic Text, which includes the Aleppo Codex (10th century), and Codex Leningradensis (1008).

There is also a translation into Koine Greek known as the Septuagint, made in the last few centuries BC; some extant ancient manuscripts of this version include Codex Vaticanus (B; B; 4th century), Codex Sinaiticus (S; BHK: S; 4th century), and Codex Alexandrinus (A; A; 5th century).

Analysis
The structure of the book is as follows:
The Prologue (chapters 1–2)
The Dialogue (chapters 3–31)
The Verdicts (32:1–42:6)
The Epilogue (42:7–17)

Within the structure, chapter 40 is grouped into the Verdict section with the following outline:
Elihu's Verdict (32:1–37:24)
God's Appearance (Yahweh Speeches) and Job's Responses (38:1–42:6)
God's First Speech (38:1–40:2)
Theme Verse and Summons (38:1–3)
The Physical World (38:4–38)
The Physical Earth (38:4–7)
The Sea (38:8–11)
The Morning (38:12–15)
The Outer Limits of the Earth (38:16–18)
Light and Darkness (38:19–21)
The Waters – Snow, Hail, Rain, Frost, Ice (38:22–30)
The Heavenly Bodies (38:31–33)
Storms (38:34–38)
The Animal World (38:39–40:2)
God Provides for the Lions and Ravens (38:39–41)
The Mountain Goats (39:1–4)
The Wild Donkey (39:5–8)
The Wild Ox (39:9–12)
The Ostrich (39:13–18)
The Warhorse (39:19–25)
The Hawk and the Eagle (39:26–30)
Brief Challenge to Answer (40:1–2)
Job's First Reply – An Insufficient Response (40:3–5)
God's Second Speech (40:6–41:34)
Theme Verse and Summons (40:6–8)
The Challenge Expanded (40:9–14)
The Challenge of Controlling Behemoth (40:15–24)
Leviathan (41:1–34)
The Challenge to Contend with Leviathan (41:1–7)
Some Conclusions (41:8–11)
His Armor (41:12–17)
His Breathing. of Fire (41:18–21)
His Strength (41:22–25)
Weapons Cannot Defeat Him (41:26–29)
He Creates Turmoil (41:30–32)
Conclusion (41:33–34)
Job's Second Reply (42:1–6)

God's speeches in chapters 38–41 can be split in two parts, both starting with almost identical phrases and having a similar structure:

The revelation of the Lord to Job is the culmination of the book of Job, that the Lord speaks directly to Job and displays his sovereign power and glory. Job has lived through the suffering—without cursing God, holding his integrity, and nowhere regretted it – but he was unaware of the real reason for his suffering, so God intervenes to resolve the spiritual issues that surfaced. Job was not punished for sin and Job’s suffering had not cut him off from God, now Job sees the end the point that he cannot have the knowledge to make the assessments he made, so it is wiser to bow in submission and adoration of God than to try to judge him.

Chapter 40 opens with a short dialogue between YHWH and Job (verses 1–5) interposed between the first and second speeches of YHWH. It is followed by God's second speech which focuses mainly on two figures: Behemoth (Job 40) and Leviathan (Job 41).

Dialogue between God and Job (40:1–5)
The inclusion of legal terms ("contend… argue… answer) from the litigation motif suggests that YHWH does not intend to present evidence for the defense, but rather to show Job why the process is flawed, because Job wishes to see God in court based on the very narrow view of the retributive justice in the world. YHWH is not just a judge, but also the king who actively exercises his sovereign rule, with a complex governing of the universe. YHWH's summation (verse 2) shows Job the futility of his pursue and the implied way forward for Job to acknowledge it.

Verse 2
[YHWH said:] "Shall the one who contends with the Almighty correct Him?
He who rebukes God, let him answer it."
"Contends": translated from the Hebrew word , rov, the infinitive absolute from the verb , riv ("to contend”); the repoint of the word to be an active participle would render it as "the one who argues with the Almighty".

Verse 4
[Job said:] "Behold, I am vile;
What shall I answer You?
I lay my hand over my mouth."
"Vile" translated from the Hebrew word , qalloti" ("to be light; to be of small account; to be unimportant"), from which comes the meaning "contemptible"; in the causative stem would mean "to treat with contempt; to curse".
Job's acknowledgement that he is "small" ("vile"; rather than he has sinned) shows the turning point from arguing against YHWH into accepting what YHWH has done in Job's life. This answer of Job is still tentative, so YHWH proceeds with a second round of questions and observations (Job 40:6–41:34) to finally prompt Job to give his ultimate response (Job 42:1–6).

God speaks of Behemoth (40:6–24)
God's second speech begins with a challenge to announce the theme (40:6–14), before proceeding with the description of Behemoth (40:15–24) and Leviathan ((41:1–34). These two creatures are described as big in size and uncontrollable by humans, but YHWH totally control them all in his orderly world. 

Verse 6Then the  answered Job out of the whirlwind, and said:Cross reference: Job 38:1
"Whirlwind": or "storm", a common accompaniment for a theophany (cf. Ezekiel 1:4; Nahum 1:3; Zechariah 9:14). It was a sign of the arrival of YHWH before speaking to the people of Israel (Exodus 19:16–20:21). In the early part of the book of Job, a storm caused Job's pain (Job 1:19; 9:17), and now becomes the setting of YHWH's direct communication to Job.

Verse 15
[YHWH said:] "Look now at the behemothwhich I made along with you;he eats grass like an ox."''
"Behemoth": in Hebrew literally means "beast" (in the feminine plural form), here refers to a large animal with unknown exact identity. It has been identified with the hippopotamus, which lives in Egypt, not in Palestine, although it can also be used as a normal word for a great beast including a large cow. Behemoth has gone on to become a term frequently used to describe a large and cumbersome object. The term, when used to describe a person alludes to dehumanisation.

"Along with you": in Hebrew literally "with you"; may be a temporal meaning ("when I made you")—perhaps a reference to the sixth day of creation. Although Behemoth cannot be controlled by humans, YHWH securely controls it, so it does not become a threat to the divine order of the world (Job 40:19).

See also

Related Bible parts: Job 38, Job 39, Job 41,

References

Sources

External links
 Jewish translations:
 Iyov - Job - Chapter 40 (Judaica Press) translation [with Rashi's commentary] at Chabad.org
 Christian translations:
 Online Bible at GospelHall.org (ESV, KJV, Darby, American Standard Version, Bible in Basic English)
 Book of Job Chapter 40. Various versions
  Various versions

40